The Mario franchise is a video game series created by Nintendo. Nintendo is usually the developer and publisher of the franchise's games, but various games are developed by third-party companies, such as Hudson Soft and Intelligent Systems. Games in the Mario franchise primarily revolve around the protagonist Mario and often involve the trope of Bowser as the antagonist kidnapping Princess Peach, with Mario then rescuing her. Many characters have goals or plot arcs that vary between series; for example, the Luigi's Mansion games focus on Luigi ridding a haunted building of ghost-like creatures known as Boos, and Wario stars in games that center around his greed and desire for money and treasure.

The franchise began with Donkey Kong in 1981, where Mario, Donkey Kong, and Pauline originated. Japanese video game designer Shigeru Miyamoto built them off the base of characters from Popeye. Unable to license the characters, Miyamoto made later changes to their appearances and personalities, such as a more lighthearted in tone. Due to the breakthrough critical and commercial success of Donkey Kong, Mario reappeared in Mario Bros. in 1983, which introduced Mario's twin brother Luigi, and Super Mario Bros. in 1985, which introduced Toad alongside numerous enemies, with Bowser and Princess Peach replacing Donkey Kong and Pauline, respectively.

Each series has introduced numerous characters, many of them recurring. Some have starred in their own games or in supporting roles. The games all typically share common enemies.

Primary protagonists

Mario

 (voiced by Charles Martinet) is the main character of the Mario franchise and the mascot of Nintendo as a whole. He originally appeared in 1981's Donkey Kong as "Jumpman", designed by Shigeru Miyamoto. While Mario was initially a carpenter, he later took the role of a plumber. Since 1992, Mario has been voiced by Charles Martinet. In most of his appearances, Mario rescues a damsel in distress (often Princess Peach) from an antagonist (often Bowser). Mario's younger brother is Luigi, and his greedy rival is Wario. Yoshi serves as Mario's steed in several games, including Super Mario World. Since his introduction, Mario's abilities include jumping, such as onto an enemy's head as an attack. Mario uses power-ups, such as the Super Mushroom (which allows him to grow larger and survive an additional hit), the Super Star (which grants him temporary invincibility), and the Fire Flower (which allows him to throw fireballs). Several power-ups grant Mario the ability to fly, such as the Super Leaf from Super Mario Bros. 3. According to Guiness World Records, Mario is the second most recognizable video game character after Pac-Man. Mario has seen numerous cultural appearances, such as during the closing ceremony of the 2016 Summer Olympics, where Japanese prime minister Shinzō Abe appeared dressed as the character.

Luigi

 (voiced by Charles Martinet) is the younger twin brother of Mario, who Luigi feels a sense of envy and reverence towards. In the 1983 game Mario Bros., Luigi was introduced as the second player character, with many similarities to Mario. While he was initially identical to Mario, he began developing differences in Super Mario Bros.: The Lost Levels (1986), which gave him a higher and further jump at the expense of responsiveness and precision. In the North American version of Super Mario Bros. 2 (1988), Luigi was given a taller and thinner appearance than Mario, which played a key role in shaping his modern appearance. Luigi's first starring role was in 1993's Mario Is Missing!, though he played only minor roles in subsequent games until 2001 with Luigi's Mansion, where he plays the role of a frightened, unsure, and goofy protagonist attempting to save his brother. The Year of Luigi was celebrated in 2013, which saw many Luigi games released to commemorate the character's 30th anniversary.

Princess Peach

 (voiced by Samantha Kelly), is the princess of the Mario franchise's Mushroom Kingdom. In the main series games, she typically plays the role of a damsel in distress who needs to be rescued by Mario. When playable, she typically has the ability to float in the air, and is physically taller than Mario. Her first playable appearance in a main series Mario game was 1988's Super Mario Bros. 2, while her second was 2013's Super Mario 3D World. Peach played a starring role in Super Princess Peach (2005), where she aims to rescue Mario, Luigi, and Toad, aided by a parasol named Perry and several abilities based on her emotions–or "vibes". She makes frequent appearances in spin-off Mario games, such as the Mario Kart series and the Mario sports games. In the 2017 game Super Mario Odyssey, after being captured by and forced to marry Bowser, and subsequently rescued by Mario, she rejects both of them and instead takes a trip around the world, though Mario rejoins her.

Princess Daisy

 (voiced by Deanna Mustard) is the princess of Sarasaland, the setting of Super Mario Land (1989). Since then, she has primarily appeared as a playable character in spin-off Mario games, especially Mario sports games. Super Mario Run (2016) marks Daisy's playable debut in a main series game, where she is able to perform a double jump. She acts more tomboyish than Princess Peach, exemplified by her appearances in the Mario sports games. Some consider her and Luigi to be a couple, despite Daisy being rescued by Mario in Super Mario Land and Super Mario Run.

Yoshi

 (once Romanized as Yossy; voiced by Kazumi Totaka) is a green anthropomorphic dinosaur character. He is depicted with a long tongue that can be used to eat enemies, and can turn the enemies he eats into eggs that release power-ups or can be thrown. Yoshi is a rideable character for the heroes or a playable character in most of the Mario spin-offs, including his own series.

Rosalina 

 (voiced by Laura Faye Smith) is a princess character introduced in 2007's Super Mario Galaxy. As a child who fled into space after her mother's death, she becomes the adoptive mother of the Lumas — mysterious and friendly star-like creatures that inhabit space in the Mario franchise. She resides in the Cosmet Observatory, a starship used to traverse the Mario universe. In later appearances, she typically takes the role of a supporting character, and primarily appears in spin-off games such as the Mario sports games, Mario Kart series, and Super Smash Bros. series. In Super Mario 3D World (2013), she is a playable character, and is unlocked through gameplay.

Toad 

 (voiced by Samantha Kelly) is an anthropomorphic mushroom-like character. The character debuted in Super Mario Bros. (1985), though his first starring role was in Wario's Woods (1994), in which the player is able to control Toad to solve puzzles. Toad made his playable debut in a main series Mario game in 1988 with Super Mario Bros. 2, and frequently acts as a non-playable character in Mario role-playing games. The character is a member of the eponymous Toad species, which includes characters such as Captain Toad, Toadette, and Toadsworth. Keegan-Michael Key voices Toad in The Super Mario Bros. Movie (2023).

Toadette
 (voiced by Samantha Kelly) is a pink Toad character who debuted in Mario Kart: Double Dash!! (2003) as a playable driver. Toadette is depicted with two long round pigtails with white spots and a dress, to distinguish from Toad. Since Super Mario Odyssey, Toadette is a member of the Toad Brigade and has the role of an archivist. Depending on the game, she is either a supporting character or a protagonist, playable in most of the Mario spin-off games. In New Super Mario Bros. U Deluxe, a power-up called the Super Crown allows Toadette to transform into Peachette, a form that highly resembles Princess Peach. As Peachette, she can use Peach's floating jump to hover, and can perform a double jump.

Captain Toad

 (voiced by Samantha Kelly) is an explorer and the leader of the Toad Brigade, debuting in Super Mario Galaxy. He subsequently appears in Super Mario Galaxy 2 or Super Mario Odyssey, and as a "treasure tracker". He makes several cameos within Super Smash Bros. and debuted in the Mario Kart series in Mario Kart Tour as a playable racer. He is the main protagonist in the subset of levels in Super Mario 3D World called Captain Toad's Adventures, and in the game Captain Toad: Treasure Tracker.

Birdo

Birdo first appeared in Super Mario Bros. 2 as a recurring boss character. Since then, she has been a recurring playable character in various franchise spin-offs. Birdo has been referred to as a "man who thinks of himself as female" in earlier depictions, such as in the Japanese manual for the early prototype game Doki Doki Panic, and was considered female in later games. It is heavily speculated that Birdo is transgender; she was considered to be one of the first ever transgender video game characters.

Pauline

 (voiced by Kate Higgins) debuted in Donkey Kong (1981), and is further featured in Donkey Kong (1994) for Game Boy, and the Mario vs. Donkey Kong series. She was created by Shigeru Miyamoto, is the earliest example of a female with a speaking role in a video game, and is cited as a famous example of a damsel in distress in fiction. She is the mayor of New Donk City in Super Mario Odyssey.

Kong family

Donkey Kong

 (voiced by Takashi Nagasako) is a male gorilla that stars in the Donkey Kong franchise. He is the leader of the Kong Family, a group of various primates.

Diddy Kong

 (Diddy) (voiced by Katsumi Suzuki) is an anthropomorphic monkey character who is Donkey Kong's nephew, sidekick, and best friend, appearing in the Donkey Kong and Mario franchises. He is the main protagonist of Diddy Kong Racing and its DS remake. He is depicted as a cheerful and kind character. Created by Rare, the name Diddy is a British term meaning "little".

Cranky Kong

 is an older Kong. His first appearance was in 1981's Donkey Kong, where, as the game's antagonist, he kidnapped Pauline, though he was stopped by Mario.

Other supporting characters

Poochy
 is portrayed as Yoshi's helper dog. He debuted in Super Mario World 2: Yoshi's Island and continued through the Yoshi series such as in Poochy & Yoshi's Woolly World. In the games, he can do things that Yoshi cannot, such as sniff out hidden items, cross over dangerous terrain, and jump over walls to give Yoshi a boost out of his wall jumps.

Professor E. Gadd
 (voiced by Kazumi Totaka), more commonly known as Professor E. Gadd, is a scientist and inventor. He primarily appears in the Luigi's Mansion series, in which he invented several objects, such as Luigi's Poltergust 3000 and Gooigi from Luigi's Mansion 3. He is referenced in Super Mario Sunshine as the inventor of Mario's F.L.U.D.D., a device that allows him to spray water. The character has made cameo appearances in series such as Mario Party and Mario & Luigi.

Toadsworth
 (voiced by Scott Burns) is an elderly Toad character who is Princess Peach's steward. He is depicted showing concern for the princess' safety and acts as a prime caretaker for the Toads. He debuted in Super Mario Sunshine for GameCube, in which he goes on vacation with Mario, Peach and the other Toads. In Mario & Luigi: Partners in Time, he is revealed to have cared for the princess since she was a baby.

Lumas
The Lumas are depicted as friendly star-like creatures. They first appear in Super Mario Galaxy, where they have the ability to transform into various game objects, explorable planetoids, and entire levels. Lumas come in a variety of colors, though are most commonly yellow. One particular Luma, Baby Luma, or Young Master Luma, is a major character in the Super Mario Galaxy games, granting Mario or Luigi the power to Star Spin.

Nabbit 
Nabbit is a rabbit-like creature who steals items from Toad. He was introduced in New Super Mario Bros. U (2012). In New Super Luigi U and New Super Mario Bros. U Deluxe, he is a playable character.

Antagonists

Bowser

 or King Koopa (voiced by Kenneth W. James) is the king of the turtle-like Koopa race, a selfish troublemaker who wants to take over the Mushroom Kingdom. He is depicted as Mario's nemesis, and is the final boss of most Mario games. He is playable in most Mario spin-off games.

 is a recurring antagonist in the Mario series. Debuting as a form of Bowser after losing his flesh in New Super Mario Bros., the character has appeared as his own being starting with Mario Kart Wii, often serving as the final antagonist in the main games. Dry Bowser appears in Mario Party: Island Tour, and is a playable character in several of the Mario spin-off games.

Bowser Jr.

 in Japan; voiced by Caety Sagoian), or sometimes simply Jr. or Junior, is the son of Bowser, who first appeared in the 2002 game Super Mario Sunshine. He is often depicted as the secondary antagonist throughout the Mario series. In the games, Bowser Jr. looks up to his dad, and shares his ambition to defeat Mario, and take over the Mushroom Kingdom. Bowser Jr. is playable in most of the spin-off Mario games, and in Super Smash Bros. He is the main protagonist of Bowser Jr.'s Journey (2018) included in the remake of Mario & Luigi: Bowser's Inside Story.

Wario

 (voiced by Charles Martinet) is an obese yet muscular, hot-tempered, and greedy man. He is Mario's yellow-and-purple clad arch-rival. He initially debuted as an antagonist, but over the years has become an anti-hero, even being playable in a few games. Wario is the protagonist of the Wario series and is playable in most of the Mario spin-off games where he is shown to be Waluigi's partner. His name is portmanteau of "warui", the Japanese word for "bad", and "Mario". Wario's favorite food is garlic, often used in gameplay to restore health when he gets defeated.

Waluigi

 (voiced by Charles Martinet) is a tall, thin, and mischievous man who was introduced in Mario Tennis as Wario's partner. He is Luigi's black-and-purple clad arch-rival. Waluigi is often an antagonist who teams up with Wario to accomplish their schemes. He is playable in most of the Mario spin-off games, and makes several cameos within the Super Smash Bros. series. Like with Wario, his name is a portmanteau of "warui" and "Luigi".

Koopalings

The  are seven siblings who first appeared as boss characters in the 1988 game Super Mario Bros. 3. Their individual names are Ludwig, Lemmy, Roy, Iggy, Wendy, Morton, and Larry. The Koopalings were originally established as Bowser's children. Older Mario games maintain reference to them as such in updated manuals and re-releases. They have since been depicted as Bowser's minions in games following the release of New Super Mario Bros. Wii in 2009, with Shigeru Miyamoto stating in 2012 that "our current story is that the seven Koopalings are not Bowser's children. Bowser's only child is Bowser Jr." The Koopalings have additionally appeared in other Super Mario games, spin-off Mario games, the animated Adventures of Super Mario Bros. 3 and Super Mario World, and the Super Smash Bros. series.

Kamek

 (voiced by Atsushi Masaki) is a member of the fictional Magikoopa species who is Bowser's childhood caretaker, and then one of his high-ranking minions. Kamek is the main antagonist of the Yoshi series. In his various game appearances, his magic includes self-duplication, teleportation, shooting magical blasts, and changing the size of other creatures. He is often distinguished from other Magikoopas by the broom he rides on. In Japan, his species is also named Kamek, but outside Japan they are called Magikoopas. This will sometimes lead to a literal translation, as in Super Princess Peach where a boss is described as "A Kamek made huge by magic". Some Japanese sources such as the guide for Super Mario Advance 3: Yoshi's Island call him "Fang" to distinguish him from regular Magikoopas.

King Boo
 (voiced by Toru Asakawa) is the king of the Boos, and is the main antagonist of the Luigi's Mansion series. He plays minor roles, occasionally playable, in various other Mario games, including the Mario Kart and Mario Party series. King Boo's first major debuted role was as the final boss of Luigi's Mansion, where he disguised himself as Bowser. He is depicted as much larger than the average Boos that appear in games after Luigi's Mansion. He dons a crown with a large ruby, and has glowing, sunken eyes in the Luigi's Mansion franchise. A similar character named Big Boo is an enemy in Super Mario World, and a boss in Super Mario 64 DS. Additionally, a different character also named King Boo, known as Boss Boo in Japan, appears as a boss in Super Mario Sunshine.

Petey Piranha
Whereas normal Piranha Plants are usually depicted growing from pipes, Petey's leaves and roots are foot-like and arm-like appendages, allowing the character to use objects such as tennis rackets and golf clubs when playable in the various Mario sports games. He can sometimes use his leaves to fly around. He debuted as the primary boss of Bianco Hills in the game Super Mario Sunshine. Similar Piranha Plant boss characters later appear in Super Mario Galaxy and its sequel.

Fawful

 (voiced by Nami Funashima), known in Japan as Gerakobits, is a recurring antagonist in the Mario & Luigi series. The character is considered to be "insane," and speaks in a "schizophasic" manner. He served as the secondary antagonist of Superstar Saga, and the main antagonist of Bowser's Inside Story.

Enemy characters
 Blooper - A sentry-like squid that chases after the player, debuting in Super Mario Bros. Blooper Nannies thrust smaller versions of themselves toward the player.
  - A bomb enemy introduced in Super Mario Bros. 2 with a wind-up key and a fuse, which explodes after a set amount of time or when thrown. King Bob-omb, previously Big Bob-omb, was introduced in Super Mario 64, as a boss character there and in Mario Party 9, Mario & Luigi: Paper Jam, and Mario Party: Star Rush.
 Boo, known in Japan as  - A spherical ghost enemy introduced in Super Mario Bros. 3, which sneaks up on the player from behind while they are facing away from it. Inspired by a rage that Takashi Tezuka's wife went into after he came home from work late.
 Bullet Bill - A bullet with angry eyes and clenched fists that is shot out of a cannon called a "Bill Blaster". They have a larger counterpart with a shark-like face, known as Banzai Bills.
 Chain Chomp - A metallic ball-and-chain creature that lunges at the player when they approach it. Inspired by a childhood experience of Shigeru Miyamoto's with a violent dog.	
 Cheep Cheep - This circular, usually red, fish debuted in Super Mario Bros. Cheep Cheeps are found primarily in the water, but some can jump in an arc, or fly within a limited range. Giant varieties attempt to swallow the player, such as Boss Bass and Big Bertha. Porcupuffers are giant variants with spiked backs. Fish Bones are skeletons that charge at the player and break apart upon a wall collision.
 Dry Bones - A walking Koopa Troopa skeleton that reassembles itself after being hit, unless defeated by a Super Star, a Cape Feather, Super Leaf, or an Ice Flower.
 Fuzzy - A spiked creature which hangs in the air, and sometimes moves on rails. It debuted in Super Mario World.
 Goomba - A sentient mushroom creature, which is the first enemy that the player typically encounters in the games' first levels. Implemented late in the development of Super Mario Bros as a basic, easy enemy. Variants of the Goomba may have wings, known as the Paragoomba, and similar creatures include the Galoomba, which flips over and can be thrown when stomped on, and the Goombrat, which turns at edges.
 Hammer Bro - A type of helmet-wearing Koopa who throws hammers at the player. It has several variations that throw other projectiles, such as the Boomerang Bro and the Fire Bro, and a bigger variant known as a Sledge Bro which can stun the player.
 Koopa Troopa - A foot soldier of Bowser. It retracts in its shell when stomped on, after which it can be used to attack other foes. Variants of the Koopa may have wings, where it is known as the Paratroopa or the Koopa Paratroopa. There are many other varieties of the Koopa Troopa such as red, yellow, and blue. Several other subspecies appear throughout the Mario games.
 Buzzy Beetle - A black or blue beetle-like creature with a hard, fireproof shell that renders it immune to fire attacks. It can crawl on ceilings and drop down when the player gets too close.
 Chargin' Chuck - A Koopa wearing football gear that mostly charges at the player, and can use items such as baseballs and shovels.
 Mechakoopa - A robot with a wind-up key that becomes disabled and can be thrown after being stomped on. A variant introduced in Super Mario Galaxy is capable of breathing fire.
 Spike Top - A red wall-crawling beetle-like creature which combines the Buzzy Beetle's immunity to fire and the Spiny's immunity to being jumped on, although it can be spin-jumped on.
 Spiny - A red beetle-like creature that damages the player if touched from above. They are often thrown by Lakitus in unlimited supplies.
  - A cloud-riding Koopa with aviator goggles that drops an endless supply of Spinies. It also appears in Mario spin-off games with various roles including Mario Kart.
 Magikoopa - A wizard Koopa capable of casting magic spells, turning blocks into foes, power-ups, or coins. Magikoopas first appeared in Super Mario World. Kamek and Kammy Koopa are recurring individuals of this species, appearing in the Yoshi and Paper Mario series, respectively.

 Monty Mole - A mole-like enemy that burrows underground, and springs out of the ground when the player gets close. A similar enemy known as the Rocky Wrench pops out of airship manholes and throws wrenches at the player.
 Piranha Plant - A leafy, stalk-topped carnivorous plant with sharp teeth that typically lives within pipes. Known as Pakkun Flower in Japan, it has made numerous appearances outside of the Mario franchise, including as a playable character in Super Smash Bros. Ultimate via downloadable content.
 Podoboo - A fireball that jumps out of lava and can bounce off walls. It is also referred to as a Lava Bubble (a name shared with other lava based enemies). A Blue Podoboo homes in on the player and jumps out of blue lava and is found in Super Princess Peach, and a variant of the Lava Bubble that chases after the player and spits fireballs appears mainly in the Paper Mario games.
 Pokey - A spiked cactus with detachable green or yellow body segments, which first appeared in the international Super Mario Bros. 2.
 Shy Guy - A timid masked creature wearing a robe, which comes in many different colors and variations. Introduced in the international Super Mario Bros. 2, but more commonly portrayed as an enemy to Yoshi since Yoshi's Island. Some variants include the Snifit, a Shy Guy with a cannon on its mask which it uses to fire bullets, and the Fly Guy, a Shy Guy with a propeller on its head that can fly. Voiced by Nintendo of America localization manager Nate Bihldorff.
 Spike - A green Koopa creature that attacks with spiked balls, which it throws out of its mouth. First appeared in Super Mario Bros. 3.
 Thwomp - A large stone block with an angry face that is mainly encountered in castles. It attempts to crush the player, usually from above. There is a smaller variation of the Thwomp called a Thwimp.
 Whomp - An anthropomorphic stone slab that slams its face on the ground when the player gets near. It can only be defeated by ground pounding its back. Inspired by the Japanese mythical wall monster, the nurikabe.
 Wiggler - A caterpillar enemy introduced in Super Mario World, which changes color and charges at the player when stomped on. It is a playable character in Mario Kart 7. Some Wigglers, known as Flutters, have butterfly wings.

See also
 Bowsette — a fan-made character based upon Bowser and Peachette

Notes

References

External links

 List of characters at the Super Mario Wiki, a Mario-centric wiki

Mario